Shammar may refer to:

 Shammar, an Arab tribe

Events 
 Battle of Jabal Shammar (1929)

Places 
 Shammar Mountains, a mountain range in northern Saudi Arabia
 Emirate of Jabal Shammar, a historical monarchy